The National Union for Democracy and Rally (UNADER) is a political party in the Central African Republic.

History
Established in 2004, the party joined the National Convergence "Kwa Na Kwa" alliance for the 2005 general elections. The alliance won 42 seats, of which UNADER won two.

Several Kwa Na Kwa factions merged into a single political party in August 2009, but UNADER remained a separate party. It contested the 2011 general elections, nominating eight candidates for the 105 seats in the National Assembly.

References

2004 establishments in the Central African Republic
Political parties established in 2004
Political parties in the Central African Republic